Gandeh Cheshmeh (also known as Gandāb and Qondāb) is a village in Fariman Rural District, in the Central District of Fariman County, Razavi Khorasan Province, Iran. The biggest city nearby is Suryakumar. At the 2005 census, its population was 265, in 61 families.

References 

Populated places in Fariman County